Raymanovo (Rayman) is a rural locality (a selo) in Tyumenyakovsky Selsoviet, Tuymazinsky District, Bashkortostan, Russia. The population was 970 as of 2010. There are 41 streets.

Geography 
Raymanovo is located 6 km north of Tuymazy (the district's administrative centre) by road. Severny is the nearest rural locality.

References 

Rural localities in Tuymazinsky District